Australian singer Kylie Minogue has released fifteen studio albums, thirteen compilation albums, nine live albums, ten extended plays (EP), eleven remix albums and two box sets. With estimated career sales of over 80 million albums worldwide as of July 2020, Minogue is recognized as the highest-selling female Australian recording artist of all time. Referred as the “Princess of Pop” by various media outlets, she has scored seven number-one albums on the ARIA Albums Chart, the most for any female Australian artist. In the United Kingdom, she holds the record for being the first woman to score a number 1 on the Official Albums Chart in five consecutive decades, from the 1980s to the 2020s.

Minogue signed a recording contract with Mushroom Records in early 1987, and released her self-titled debut album the following year. Written and produced by Stock Aitken Waterman, the album was distributed in the UK by Waterman's own label, PWL Records. The album spent six weeks at number one on the UK Albums Chart, eventually became the fifth highest-selling album of the decade. It has sold over 5 million copies worldwide. Her second album, Enjoy Yourself (1989) debuted at number one in the UK and became the sixth best-selling album of the year. She subsequently released Rhythm of Love (1990) and Let's Get to It (1991), both reached the top 20 in the UK and Australia. Her final release under PWL Records, Greatest Hits (1992), was her third number-one entry in the UK. 

During her years under Deconstruction Records, Minogue released the self-titled album in 1994 and Impossible Princess in 1997. Both albums peaked inside the top ten in the UK and Australia. After moving to Parlophone in 1999, she earned her first number-one album in her home country with Light Years (2000). Minogue scored the best-selling album of her career with Fever (2001), which sold over 6 million copies worldwide as of May 2008. It was the thirtieth best-selling album globally in 2002, according to the International Federation of the Phonographic Industry. Her next releases under Parlophone were studio albums Body Language (2003) and X (2007), as well as the greatest hits album Ultimate Kylie (2004)—all reached platinum status in Australia and the UK. In 2010, Aphrodite debuted at number one in the UK, making Minogue the first female artist to have number one albums in four consecutive decades. In 2012, Minogue released the greatest hits album The Best of Kylie Minogue and the orchestral album The Abbey Road Sessions to celebrate her twenty-fifth year in the music industry. 

Released during her short-lived contract with entertainment company Roc Nation, Kiss Me Once (2014) became her fourth number-one album in Australia. Minogue collaborated with record producers Fernando Garibay and Giorgio Moroder in two experimental EPs, Sleepwalker (2014) and Kylie and Garibay (2015), before releasing her final record under Parlophone—the Christmas album Kylie Christmas (2015). The album was re-released in the following year with additional tracks, retitled Kylie Christmas: Snow Queen Edition. In 2017, Minogue signed a global recording contract with BMG Rights Management and a joint-deal with Mushroom Music Labels in distributing her albums in Australia and New Zealand. Her subsequent releases under BMG were studio albums Golden (2018) and Disco (2020), as well as the compilation album Step Back in Time: The Definitive Collection (2019)—all debuted at number one in both Australia and the UK. Golden and Disco are among the fastest-selling vinyl albums of the century in the UK, according to the Official Charts Company in March 2021.

Studio albums

Reissue albums

Compilation albums

Live albums

Remix albums

Box sets

Extended plays

Notes
Notes for sales figure

Notes for peak chart positions

References

Sources

  The High Point number in the NAT column displays the release's peak on the national chart.

External links

 
 
 

Discographies of Australian artists
Discography
Pop music discographies